The Alcântara Formation is a geological formation in northeastern Brazil whose strata date back to the Cenomanian of the Late Cretaceous.

Fossil content

Dinosaurs

Pterosauria

Crocodylomorphs

Turtles

Squamates

Fish

References 

Geologic formations of Brazil
Upper Cretaceous Series of South America
Cretaceous Brazil
Cenomanian Stage
Sandstone formations
Shale formations
Conglomerate formations
Shallow marine deposits
Fossiliferous stratigraphic units of South America
Paleontology in Brazil
Formations